Ischnura abyssinica is a species of damselfly in the family Coenagrionidae. It is endemic to Ethiopia.  Its natural habitats are subtropical or tropical high-altitude grassland, rivers, swamps, freshwater lakes, intermittent freshwater lakes, and freshwater marshes. It is threatened by habitat loss.

References 

Endemic fauna of Ethiopia
Ischnura
Insects of Ethiopia
Insects described in 1907
Taxonomy articles created by Polbot